Daniel Charles Drucker (June 3, 1918 – September 1, 2001) was American civil and mechanical engineer and academic, who served as president of the Society for Experimental Stress Analysis (now Society for Experimental Mechanics) in 1960–1961, as president of the American Society of Mechanical Engineers in the year 1973–74, and as president of the American Academy of Mechanics in 1981–82.

Drucker was known as an authority on the theory of plasticity in the field of applied mechanics. His key contributions to the field of plasticity include the concept of material stability described by the Drucker stability postulates and the Drucker–Prager yield criterion.

Biography

Youth and education 
Drucker was born in New York City. His father Moses Abraham Drucker was a civil engineer, and Drucker wanted to follow in his footsteps.

Drucker studied at the Columbia University, where he obtained his BSc in civil engineering in 1938. Next, in 1940 he obtained his PhD in mechanical engineering under Raymond D. Mindlin.

Career, honours and awards 
Drucker taught at Brown University from 1946 until 1968 when he joined the University of Illinois as Dean of Engineering. In 1984 he left Illinois to become a graduate research professor at the University of Florida until his retirement in 1994.

He received the Murray Lecture and Award in 1967, title the seventh Honorary Member in 1969, Frocht Award in 1971 and title of Fellow from the Society for Strain Analysis (SESA), now known as the Society for Experimental Mechanics (SEM). In 1988,  Drucker was awarded the National Medal of Science. He was a member of the National Academy of Engineering and of the American Academy of Arts and Sciences. The Drucker Medal is named in his honor. He was also awarded the Timoshenko Medal in 1983.

Daniel C. Drucker Medal 

The Daniel C. Drucker Medal, awarded by the American Society of Mechanical Engineers, was named in his honor in 1998.  Drucker was the first recipient of this annual award.

 1998 Daniel C. Drucker
 1999 Ascher H. Shapiro
 2000 Philip G. Hodge
 2001 Bruno A. Boley
 2002 George J. Dvorak
 2003 Leon M. Keer
 2004 Frank A. McClintock
 2005 Robert L. Taylor
 2006 Alan Needleman
 2007 Albert S. Kobayashi
 2008 Thomas C. T. Ting
 2009 James R. Barber
 2010 Rohan Abeyaratne
 2011 John W. Rudnicki
 2012 James W. Dally
 2013 Yonggang Huang
 2014 Lallit Anand
 2015 Krishnaswamy Ravi-Chandar
 2016 Kyung-Suk Kim
 2017 David Parks
 2018 David M. Barnett
 2019 John Bassani
 2020 Glaucio H. Paulino
 2021 Markus J. Buehler

Death 
Drucker died from leukemia on September 1, 2001.

Selected publications 
 An evaluation of current knowledge of the mechanics of brittle fracture
 Constitutive relations for finite deformation of polycrystalline metals : proceedings of the IUTAM Symposium, held in Beijing, China, July 22–25, 1991
 Fracture of solids : proceedings of an international conference sponsored by the Institute of Metals Division, American Institute of Mining, Metallurgical, and Petroleum Engineers, Maple Valley, Washington, August 21–24, 1962
 Introduction to mechanics of deformable solids
 Macroscopic fundamentals in brittle fracture, 1967:
 Mechanics of material behavior, 1983:	 
 On fitting mathematical theories of plasticity to experimental results
 Plastic design methods - advantages and limitations
 Stress analysis by three-dimensional photoclastic methods
 Stress-strain relations in the plastic range : a survey of theory and experiment

References

External links
 Daniel C. Drucker, NAP, Memorial Tributes
 

1918 births
2001 deaths
American mechanical engineers
Columbia School of Engineering and Applied Science alumni
University of Florida faculty
National Medal of Science laureates
ASME Medal recipients
Scientists from New York City
Presidents of the American Society of Mechanical Engineers
Engineers from New York City
20th-century American engineers
Brown University faculty
Fellows of the Society for Experimental Mechanics
Deaths from leukemia